"In Too Deep" is a song written by Rick Nowels and produced by Andrew Farriss for Jenny Morris's fourth studio album Salvation Jane (1995). It was released as the album's fourth single but was not successful, peaking at number 143 on the Australian ARIA singles chart.

Belinda Carlisle version

American singer Belinda Carlisle covered "In Too Deep" for her sixth studio album, A Woman and a Man (1996). Her version, produced by David Tickle, charted at number six in the United Kingdom, number 10 in Hungary, and number 11 in Australia; in the latter country, the song is certified gold by the Australian Recording Industry Association (ARIA).

Critical reception
British magazine Music Week rated the song three out of five, adding, "Same formula and very likely the same success for Carlisle. Radio is already picking up on this Rick Nowels-penned track."

Music video
The accompanying music video was directed by David Nelson. It shows Belinda in Italy, dancing in the fountain, and a man in the bathroom, presumably her ex-boyfriend. It shows her and the man at the pool, with Belinda wearing a blue jacket at one scene. At the end of the music video, she and the man, kisses as the crowd of spectators watch.

Track listings
 UK and Australian CD single
 "In Too Deep" (single edit)
 "I See No Ships"
 "Jealous Guy"
 "(We Want) the Same Thing"

 UK 7-inch picture disc and cassette single
 "In Too Deep"
 "(We Want) the Same Thing"

Charts

Weekly charts

Year-end charts

Sales and certifications

References

1995 singles
1996 singles
Jenny Morris (musician) songs
Belinda Carlisle songs
Songs written by Rick Nowels
Chrysalis Records singles
1995 songs